Maedeh Borhani Esfahani (born 22 June 1988) is a volleyball player from Iran, who plays as an Opposite Hitter and Captain of the Iran Women's National Volleyball Team. Her transfer to the Bulgarian club, Shumen W made her the first ever Iranian female volleyball player who plays outside the country and abroad. She joined Maldive police club in 2017-2018, Turkish league 1 (kecioren club) in 2018-2019 , Turkish league 1 (Samsun Anakent Spor ) in 2019-2020, Turkish league 1 Nevsehir BLD spor  in 2020-2021 , Turkish league 1 Numune GENÇLIK clup in 2021-2022 and currently in Greece A1 league Ilisiakos in 2022-2023.

Early life 
She was born in Isfahan, Iran. Borhani started professional Volleyball quite late, in 2005 when she was 17.However two years later, in 2007, she was invited to Iran women's national volleyball team.

References

1988 births
Living people
Sportspeople from Isfahan
Iranian women's volleyball players
Iranian expatriate sportspeople in Turkey
21st-century Iranian women